Fernand Picard (21 February 1906 – 21 November 1993) was a design director for Renault. known for designing the Renault 4CV and the Renault Dauphine.

References

French automotive engineers
People in the automobile industry
Arts et Métiers ParisTech alumni
1906 births
1993 deaths